Iisakki Vihtori Kosola (10 July 1884 – 14 December 1936) was the leader of the Finnish right-wing radical Lapua Movement.

Kosola was born in Ylihärmä, Southern Ostrobothnia. His family's farmhouse burnt down the next year, and the family moved to Lapua. His formative years were spent in farming and cattle-breeding.

Kosola was an active recruiter of Finnish Jäger troops to Germany from Autumn 1915, and was incarcerated in 1916. He was imprisoned in Helsinki, then at the Shpalernaya prison in St. Petersburg among other Finnish activists. He was released after the Russian Revolution and eagerly took part in the Finnish Civil War against the Red Guards and the Russians. After the war Kosola led the Lapua White Guard. He also joined the Agrarian League.

In the 1920s he organized Vientirauha, a strikebreakers' organisation, in Southern Ostrobothnia. He made a speech at the first meeting of the anti-communist Lapua Movement as it was organized in 1929, and was chosen as its leader as the movement radicalized in the following year. He took part of the abortive Mäntsälä Rebellion of 1932 that ended with the dissolution and banning of the Lapua Movement and the brief imprisonment of Kosola.

Kosola was chosen as president of the Lapua Movement's successor, the Patriotic People's Movement (IKL), but as the Movement became more political, Kosola had less time to participate in its affairs in Helsinki. Kosola's political career ended in 1936, when he was deposed from IKL's leadership; he was considered more of a liability than an asset by IKL. Contemporary accounts describe Kosola after being freed from jail as a tired and sick man who drank alcohol to deal with the stress. He was also in excessive debt and his farm was subject to foreclosure and auction. He died of pneumonia in December 1936. Kosola's first son, Niilo, bought the farm and was eventually elected as an MP and briefly as a government minister. Kosola's second son, Pentti, was imprisoned for shooting a political opponent. Pentti fought in the Winter War (1939–40) as a fighter pilot, but was killed in action.

Kosola's radical right-wing politics caused a common saying in the 1930s: "Heil Hitler, meil Kosola," accented Finnish for "They've got Hitler, we've got Kosola". Sometimes also a third stanza, "muil Mussolini" (the others have Mussolini) was added. Kosola had a sobriquet Kosolini after his charismatic and vivid style of speech similar to Benito Mussolini. According to some contemporaries, he was always conceived of as a fascist dictator of Finland.

His descendant, Jaakko Kosola, continues the legacy of his family in municipal politics, proudly admiring his great-great-grandfather and the Lapua Movement. He is deputy commissioner and chairman of the Lapua Conservative Youth.

Works
 Viimeistä Piirtoa Myöten, Lapua, 1935 (Memoirs)

References

European Right: A Historical Profile edited by Hans Rogger and Eugen Weber, the "Finland" chapter by Marvin Rintala  and  
Biographical Dictionary of the Extreme Right Since 1890 edited by Philip Rees, 1991, 
A biography from Eteläpohjalaisia elämänkertoja, 1963  (Finnish)

1884 births
1936 deaths
People from Ylihärmä
People from Vaasa Province (Grand Duchy of Finland)
Centre Party (Finland) politicians
Finnish fascists
Patriotic People's Movement (Finland) politicians
People of the Finnish Civil War (White side)
Deaths from pneumonia in Finland